Fanny Elssler is a 1920 German historical film directed by Friedrich Zelnik and starring Lya Mara, Ernst Hofmann, and Rudolf Forster. It is based on the life of the nineteenth century Austrian dancer Fanny Elssler.

The film's sets were designed by the art director Fritz Lederer.

Cast
Lya Mara as Fanny Elssler
Ernst Hofmann as Herzog von Reichstadt
Rudolf Forster as Gentz
Heinrich Peer as Metternich
Josef Reithofer as Lord Ebester
Ilka Grüning
Karl Harbacher
Hilde Arndt
Karl Platen

References

External links

1920s biographical films
1920s historical films
German biographical films
German historical films
Films of the Weimar Republic
Films directed by Frederic Zelnik
German silent feature films
Films set in Vienna
Films set in the 19th century
Cultural depictions of Klemens von Metternich
Cultural depictions of dancers
Cultural depictions of Austrian women
Films set in the Austrian Empire
1920s German films